Thomas Chrysostom O'Mara (1847 – 23 June 1891) was an Australian politician.

He was born in Tumut to pastoralist Timothy O'Mara and Johanna Quilty. He was a barrister, admitted to the bar in 1874. In 1882 he was elected to the New South Wales Legislative Assembly as the member for Tumut. Defeated in 1885, he returned in 1887 as the member for Monaro, but was defeated once more in 1889. He died at Burwood in 1891.

References

 

1847 births
1891 deaths
Members of the New South Wales Legislative Assembly
Protectionist Party politicians
19th-century Australian politicians